A spiral bridge, loop bridge, helix bridge, or pigtail bridge is a road bridge which loops over its own road, allowing the road to climb rapidly. This is useful in steep terrain, or where the approach road to a bridge would terminate too far from the bridge's end. The shape of the bridge forms a helix, not a spiral.

Many multi-storey car parks feature such a design as this.

Pigtail bridge

In the Black Hills of South Dakota, a particular form of spiral bridge, locally called a 'pigtail bridge', was introduced in 1932 by Cecil Clyde Gideon, the self-taught superintendent of Custer State Park turned highway designer. He called them “spiral-jumpoffs”. During the planning for Iron Mountain Road, there was a need to negotiate sudden elevation drops while preserving natural features for this scenic highway; the corkscrew design allowed for a spectacular—albeit expensive—solution to this problem. In order to blend the bridges with their surroundings, natural materials such as local timber were used.

Most pigtail bridges were built by the Civilian Conservation Corps in the 1930s.

List of spiral road bridges

Spiral bicycle bridges
The bridge over the mainline and narrow-gauge railways just west of Wernigerode Hauptbahnhof station in the Harz, Germany has a spiral at each end

Spiral pedestrian bridges 
1998–2004, Glass Spiral Bridge, Millennium Place, Coventry, England

Turnover bridges
Turnover bridges were a feature of some early British canals such as the Macclesfield. The boats were pulled by a horse, and in locations where the towpath crossed to the opposite bank, the spiral on one side allowed the horse to continue without detaching the tow rope. They were not universally provided as they were more expensive to build, needing to span both the canal and the towpath.

See also
Hairpin turn
Roads section of railway spiral article

References

Further reading

 Bernie Hunhoff, The Man Who Designed the Pigtails, South Dakota Magazine, 27 July 2006
 Jim Pisarowicz, Pigtail Bridge, Wind Cave National Park, National Park Service
 Brochure, Welcome to the Peter Norbeck Scenic Byway, United States Forest Service
 Missouri River Bridges of South Dakota, 1920 to 1980'', interview of Kenneth R. Scurr, Former South Dakota Bridge Engineer, by Emory Johnson, South Dakota State University

 
Road bridges